George Patterson was a Scottish amateur football outside forward who played in the Scottish League for Queen's Park. He was capped by Scotland at amateur level.

References 

Scottish footballers
Queen's Park F.C. players
Scottish Football League players
Scotland amateur international footballers
Association football outside forwards
1909 births
Year of death missing
Footballers from Glasgow
Romford F.C. players